Remak is a surname. Notable people with the surname include:

 Ernst Remak (1849-1911), German neurologist, son of Robert Remak 
 Joachim Remak (b. 1920), German-American historian of World War I 
 Patricia Remak (b. 1965), former Dutch politician
 Robert Remak (1815-1865), Polish/German neurologist, zoologist
 Robert Remak (1888–1942), German mathematician, son of Ernst Remak

See also 
 Moses ben Jacob Cordovero, known as Ramak
 REMAK, the computer from the episode "Killer" of the British TV series The Avengers
 Remake

Jewish surnames